Han Kyoo-hee (March 29, 1944 – December 18, 2014) is a South Korean voice actor.

He joined the Munhwa Broadcasting Corporation's voice acting division in 1964.

Roles

Broadcasting TV
24 (TV series) (Season 2, replacing John Terry, Korea TV Edition, MBC)
Akazukin Chacha (Korea TV Edition, MBC) 
Alps Sound (MBC) 
Bakusou Kyoudai Let's & Go!! WGP (Korea TV Edition, SBS)  
Buffy the Vampire Slayer (replacing Anthony Head, Korea TV Edition, MBC)
Captain Tailer (Korea TV Edition, SBS)  
CSI: Crime Scene Investigation (replacing Marc Vann, Korea TV Edition, MBC)
Dragon Ball (Korea TV Edition, SBS)  
Escaflowne (Korea TV Edition, SBS) 
Frog Wangnooni (SBS)
Great Gunder (Korea TV Edition, SBS)  
Hekcle Jeckle (Korea TV Edition, MBC)
K-Cops (Korea TV Edition, MBC)  
Pigeon Chorus (MBC) 
Super SWAT (MBC)

See also
Munhwa Broadcasting Corporation
MBC Voice Acting Division

External links
MBC Voice Acting Division Han Kyoo Hee Blog (in Korean)

South Korean male voice actors
1944 births
2014 deaths